is a video game composer and voice actor. His most notable works are his soundtracks for Nippon Ichi Software games, such as Disgaea and Phantom Brave. He also provides voice-over for games and movies.

Biography
Sato was born in 1975 in Tokyo, Japan. He began playing piano at the age of six, and made his first composition, a piece for guitar, at the age of twelve. His first job was at Telenet Japan, where he composed the score for the action role-playing game XZR and popular side-scroller Valis II. After leaving Telenet, he joined Glodia, and together with Nobuhito Koise, composed the soundtrack to the cult Emerald Dragon. Later he would compose both Vain Dream with Abreath Nakamura and Bible Master II. After leaving Glodia, he joined Birdie Software, and produced soundtracks for four of their games. Currently, he produces music for Nippon Ichi, which is where he has gained his greatest recognition, for games such as the Marl Kingdom series, Disgaea: Hour of Darkness, La Pucelle: Tactics, and Phantom Brave.

Musical style and influence
Sato cites Queen, Claude Debussy, Ryuichi Sakamoto, and Kate Bush as major musical influences.

Works
XZR: Hakai no Gūzō (1988) - with Shinobu Ogawa and Yujiroh
XZR II: Kanketsuhen (Exile) (1988) - with Shinobu Ogawa
Cyber City (1989) - with Shinobu Ogawa
Valis II (1989) - with Shinobu Ogawa, Masahiro Kajiwara, and Jizou Kurabo
Emerald Dragon (1989) - with Nobuhito Koise
Vain Dream (1991) - with Nobuhito Koise and Ikki Nakamura
Alshark (1991)
Cal (1991)
Beast (1991)
Cal II (1991)
Task Force Harrier EX (1991)
Joker 2 (1992)
Beast 2 (1992)
Imperium (1992) - with Tatsuya Sato and Hiroki Uematsu
Beast 3 (1993)
Red: The Adventurous Sequence (1993)
Alvaleak Continent (1993) - with Nobuhito Koise
Alien vs. Predator (1993) - with Hisayoshi Ogura
Shinseiki Odysselya (1993) - with Hisayoshi Ogura
Bible Master II: The Chaos of Aglia (1994)
Etemiburu: Tenjoumukyuu (1994)
Magna Braban: Henreki no Yusha (1994) - with Tatsuya Sato
Alshark (Sega CD) (1994)
Super Street Basketball 2 (1994)
Eko Eko Azaraku: Wizard of Darkness (1995)
Hard Blow (1997)
Cocktail Harmony (1998)
Rhapsody: A Musical Adventure (1998)
Combat Choro Q (1999)
Little Princess: Puppet Princess of Marl Kingdom (1999)
Magnetic Power Microman: Generation 2000 (1999)
Brigandine: Grand Edition (2000)
Real Pool (2000)
Play It Pinball (2000)
Angel's Present: Chronicles of Marl Kingdom (2000)
Gadget Racers (2000)
Marl de Jigsaw (2001)
La Pucelle: Tactics (2002)
Marl Jong!! (2003)
Disgaea: Hour of Darkness (2003)
The Conveni 3 (2003)
Baskelian (2003)
Phantom Brave (2004)
Gunslinger Girl Vol. 1 (2004)
Gunslinger Girl Vol. 2 (2004)
Gunslinger Girl Vol. 3 (2004)
Disgaea 2: Cursed Memories (2006)
Numpla & Oekaki Puzzle (2006)
Soul Nomad & the World Eaters (2007)
Prinny: Can I Really Be the Hero? (2008)
Disgaea 3: Absence of Justice (2008)
Disgaea Infinite (2009)
Prinny 2: Dawn of Operation Panties, Dood! (2010)
Disgaea 4: A Promise Unforgotten (2011)
Mugen Souls (2012)
Disgaea D2: A Brighter Darkness (2013)
Mugen Souls Z (2013)
The Witch and The Hundred Knight (2013)
Disgaea 5: Alliance of Vengeance (2015)
Makai Shin Trillion (2015)
MeiQ no Chika ni Shisu (2015)
Labyrinth of Refrain: Coven of Dusk (2016)
Brigandine: The Legend of Runersia (2020)
Disgaea 6: Defiance of Destiny (2021)

References

External links
Official website
Rocketbaby's interview with Tenpei Sato

Year of birth missing (living people)
Japanese composers
Japanese male composers
Japanese male voice actors
Living people
Musicians from Tokyo
Video game composers